Ted Woodward (born November 28, 1963) is an American former college basketball coach. He served as the head men's basketball coach at the University of Maine.   He took over the position vacated by John Giannini in 2004, and compiled a 117–178 in 10 seasons at the helm. He has two children with his wife, Linda. He currently serves as the Associate Director of Development for Athletics at the University of Connecticut.

Head coaching record

References

External links
 Maine profile

1963 births
Living people
American men's basketball coaches
Basketball coaches from New York (state)
Bucknell University alumni
Central Connecticut Blue Devils men's basketball coaches
College golf coaches in the United States
College men's basketball head coaches in the United States
UConn Huskies men's basketball coaches
Harvard Crimson men's basketball coaches
Maine Black Bears men's basketball coaches
People from Suffern, New York
Sportspeople from the New York metropolitan area